A Los Angeles Police Department C.R.A.S.H. initiative that began in April 1987, Operation Hammer was a large scale attempt to crack down on gang violence in Los Angeles, California. A year later, the LA Times reported a double-digit drop in gang violence in parts of the city. After a group of people at a birthday party were shot down on their front lawn in a drive-by shooting, Chief of Police Daryl F. Gates responded with a roundup of gang members. At the height of this operation in April 1988, 1,453 people were arrested by one thousand police officers in South Central Los Angeles (now South Los Angeles) in a single weekend.

The origin of Operation Hammer can be traced back to the 1984 Olympic Games held in Los Angeles. Under the supervision of Gates the LAPD expanded gang sweeps for the duration of the Olympics, which were implemented across wide areas of the city but especially South Central and East Los Angeles. After the games were over, old anti-syndicalist laws began to be revived to maintain the security policy instigated by the Olympic games, and mass arrests of black and Hispanic youth become more common, even though the overwhelming numbers of people arrested were never charged. Citizen complaints against police brutality increased 33 percent in the period 1984 to 1989.

According to the LA Times, August 1, 1988 featured a large-scale raid by 88 LAPD officers on "two apartment buildings on the corner of 39th Street and Dalton Avenue ... It was an all-out search for drugs and a massive show of force designed to deliver a strong message to the gangs." Police caused massive property damage (including smashed furniture, holes punched in walls, and destruction of family photos) and sprayed graffiti messages such as "LAPD Rules" and "Rollin' 30s Die." In addition, "Dozens of residents from the apartments and surrounding neighborhood were rounded up.  Many were humiliated or beaten, but none was charged with a crime.  The raid netted fewer than six ounces of marijuana and less than an ounce of cocaine." In 2001, Officer Todd Parrick said in retrospect, "We weren't just searching for drugs.  We were delivering a message that there was a price to pay for selling drugs and being a gang member."

By 1990 over 50,000 people had been arrested in raids. During this period, the LAPD arrested more young black men and women at any period of time since the Watts riots of 1965. Despite the large number of arrests, in April 1988, there were only 60 felony arrests, and charges were only filed in 32 instances. Disputing that figure, Chief Gates claimed that charges were filed on 70% of the suspects arrested.

Critics have alleged that the operation was racist because it heavily employed racial profiling, targeting African-American and Hispanic youths.  The perception that police had targeted non-Caucasian citizens likely contributed to the anger which, after the assault of motorist Rodney King, would erupt into the 1992 Los Angeles riots.

Chief Gates was asked in a 2001 PBS interview whether the local people in the minority areas expressed thanks to the police:

Sure. The good people did all the time. But the community activists? No. Absolutely not. We were out there 'oppressing' whatever the community had to be, whether it was blacks, or Hispanics. We were 'oppressing' them. Nonsense. We're out there trying to save their communities, trying to upgrade the quality of life of people ...

See also
Operation Cul-de-Sac

References 

Los Angeles Police Department
History of Los Angeles
Urban decay in the United States
Organized crime in Los Angeles
Hammer, Operation
1987 in Los Angeles